The 2010  VTV9 - Binh Dien International Women's Volleyball Cup was the 5th staging . The tournament was held in Gia Lai, Vietnam.

Pools composition

Pool standing procedure
 Number of matches won
 Match points
 Sets ratio
 Points ratio
 Result of the last match between the tied teams

Match won 3–0 or 3–1: 3 match points for the winner, 0 match points for the loser
Match won 3–2: 2 match points for the winner, 1 match point for the loser

VTV9 – Binh Dien International Women's Volleyball Cup
Voll
2010 in women's volleyball